Honoré Mercier may refer to:
 Honoré Mercier (1840–1894), a former Premier of Quebec
 Honoré Mercier, Jr. (1875–1937), a member of the Legislative Assembly of Quebec (son of the above)
 Honoré Mercier III (1908–1988), a member of the Legislative Assembly of Quebec (son and grandson of the above)
 Honoré Mercier Bridge, connecting the Island of Montreal to the south shore of the Saint Lawrence River
 Honoré-Mercier (electoral district), a federal electoral district in Quebec